"The Black Eyed Boys" is a song by the British pop group Paper Lace. This song missed the top 40 in the United States, but it fared better in Canada reaching number 37 and also in the United Kingdom, reaching number 11. It was the band's third single to be released in the UK.

Chart performance

Weekly singles charts

References

1974 singles
Paper Lace songs
1974 songs
Songs written by Mitch Murray
Songs written by Peter Callander
Philips Records singles